The 2001–02 Honduran Segunda División was the 35th season of the Honduran Segunda División.  Under the management of Javier Padilla, Honduras Salzburg won the tournament after defeating Parrillas One in the final series and obtained promotion to the 2002–03 Honduran Liga Nacional.

Movements

Final

 Honduras Salzburg 2–2 Parrillas One on aggregated.  Honduras Salzburg won 4–2 on penalty shoot-outs.

References

Segunda
2001